Crusader Kings is a grand strategy game developed by Paradox Development Studio and published by Paradox Interactive in April 2004. An expansion called Deus Vult was released in October 2007. A sequel using the newer Clausewitz Engine, Crusader Kings II, was released in February 2012, and another sequel, Crusader Kings III, was released on September 1, 2020.

Setting
The game is set primarily in Europe in the mid to late Middle Ages in the time-period from December 26, 1066 (the day after the coronation of William the Conqueror) until December 30, 1452 (five months before the fall of Constantinople). Three scenarios are also included in the game, namely: the Battle of Hastings (1066), the Third Crusade (1187), and the Hundred Years' War (started in 1337).

Gameplay
Unlike other Paradox titles (such as the first two Europa Universalis series), Crusader Kings is a dynasty simulator with similarities to role-playing video games in that it focuses on a trait-based individual whose primary goal is the growth and enrichment of their dynasty. In the game, the player attempts to lead their dynastic demesne across four centuries, while managing its familial, economic, military, political, and religious affairs and stability. Rulers are supported by appointed councillors, a Chancellor, Steward, Marshal, Spy Master, and Diocese Bishop, and oversee scutage from their vassals.

In addition, yearly random events, as well as hundreds of pre-scripted ones based on the historical themes, make for varied game play and challenges. Crusader Kings also differs from many similar turn-based strategy games in that time flows continuously rather than taking place in discrete turns. As such, the player is able to pause the game, examine the map and its characters, and make decisions and give orders, then speed up or slow down time as events take their course.

Over time, based on the territories and titles held, characters can be elevated upwards in status (from count, duke, king, to emperor substantive titles) or regress as status and lands are lost. The lowest level count vassal tiers (i.e. castle baron, city mayor, church bishop), as seen in Crusader Kings II are not represented. The game is lost if no direct member of the playable dynasty holds or inherits an imperial, royal, or noble rank.

Development
The lead game programmer was Johan Andersson. The engine for the game was based on the one developed for Europa Universalis II, i.e. the updated Europa Engine, which had been released in December 2001. The similarities between the two games, and the release of a save game converter, allow players to continue their game after 1419 through Europa Universalis II.

In North America, Crusader Kings was originally planned to be published by Strategy First. However, Paradox revealed in June 2004 that it would self-publish the game, which it called "a way for Paradox to secure our intellectual property and to serve our customers in a better way."

Reception

The game received "average" reviews according to the review aggregation website Metacritic, and many U.S. reviews came in a few months before the game's official U.S. release.

In the 2013 book Digital Gaming Re-imagines the Middle Ages, the author explains that:As digital medievalism, Crusader Kings models systems of cultural change in the Middle Ages rather than merely assigning cultural labels to people and geographic areas of Europe at specific chronological dates. The game attempts to avoid anachronism through historically based systems of gameplay, rather than through rote inclusion of historical facts.

Awards
 Strategy Gaming Online Editor's Choice award
 Game Vortex Top Pick award

Expansion 
A downloadable expansion pack called Deus Vult ("God wills it" in Latin) was released in October 2007. Improvements to the base game included:
 graphics overhaul including new windows and alert icons
 inter-character relations (including the addition of friendship and rivalry)
 new realm stability and diplomacy options (e.g. sending fosterlings to other courts)
 new character traits and the evolution of childhood stats from age 0
 new random events
 additional tools for modders

As with other Paradox games, within days of release, fan made mods began to appear such as The Deus Vult Improvement Pack, aimed at fixing bugs and making the map, cultures, and characters more historically accurate.

References

External links
Original Release Video - YouTube
Crusader Kings Tutorial (5 part series) - YouTube

2004 video games
Government simulation video games
Grand strategy video games
Video games set in the Middle Ages
MacOS games
Paradox Interactive games
Real-time strategy video games
Video games developed in Sweden
Video games scored by Inon Zur
Video games with expansion packs
Video games set in the Byzantine Empire
Windows games
Video games set in the Crusades